The Battle of Bình Giã was conducted by the Viet Cong (VC) and People's Army of Vietnam (PAVN) from December 28, 1964, to January 1, 1965, during the Vietnam War in Bình Giã, Phước Tuy province (now part of Bà Rịa–Vũng Tàu province), South Vietnam.

The year of 1964 marked a decisive turning point in the Vietnam War. Following the ousting of President Ngô Đình Diệm in 1963, South Vietnam's top army generals continued to vie with each other for control of the country's military-dominated government instead of combating the emerging forces of the VC. The fragility of the South Vietnamese government was reflected on the battlefield, where its military experienced great setbacks against the VC. Taking advantage of Saigon's political instability, leaders in Hanoi began preparing for war. Even though key members of North Vietnam's Politburo disagreed on the best strategy to reunite their country, they ultimately went ahead to prepare for armed struggle against the South Vietnam government and the American occupation.

Towards the end of 1964, the VC commenced a series of large-scale military operations against the Army of the Republic of Vietnam (ARVN). As part of their Winter-Spring Offensive, two VC Regiments attacked ARVN forces at Bình Giã, fighting a large set-piece battle for the first time. Over a period of four days, the VC held their ground and mauled the best units the ARVN could send against them, only breaking after intense attack by U.S. bombers.

Background
In 1964, the political establishment in South Vietnam was still in turmoil. Following the coup that ousted Ngô Đình Diệm, the military situation quickly worsened as the VC gained significant ground in the countryside because the Military Revolutionary Council which governed South Vietnam, lacked direction both in terms of policy and planning, and lacked political support from the population. Furthermore, General Dương Văn Minh, as the Chairman of the Military Revolutionary Council, and his civilian Prime Minister Nguyễn Ngọc Thơ favoured a political resolution instead of using military force, which brought them into conflict with the United States over the best strategy to fight the VC in South Vietnam. As a result, both men became increasingly unpopular among the military generals who held real political power in Saigon. On January 30, 1964, General Nguyễn Khánh successfully ousted Dương Văn Minh from the Military Revolutionary Council without firing a single shot. For much of the year, Khánh spent most of his efforts on consolidating political power, instead of fighting the VC.

In contrast to the political unrest in Saigon, the Communist leadership in North Vietnam and in the VC were far more concerned about the best strategy to fight the South Vietnamese government and the Americans. While all leaders in Hanoi and in the VC shared the same goal of eventual reunification of their homeland, different factions within the Communist Party disagreed on the best method to achieve their desired goal. Members of North Vietnam's Politburo were divided by the issues surrounding the Soviet strategy of peaceful co-existence versus the Chinese strategy of supporting national liberation movements in emerging countries. Despite their differences of opinion, the Communist Party leadership ultimately made preparations for armed struggle in South Vietnam. From Hanoi's perspective, the military regime in Saigon was able to hold out because the Communist main forces were still not ready to fight a conventional war, so North Vietnam must focus on the development of its military force in the shortest period of time. In the meantime, however, the war must be kept at its current level in order to prevent the full involvement of the United States military.

On October 11, 1964, the VC was ordered to carry out a series of military operations as part of the Communist winter-spring offensive. The VC Nam Bo (B-2 Front in Mekong Delta) Regional Command established a sub-command under the leadership of Trần Đình Xu, with Nguyễn Hòa as the deputy commander, and Lê Trọng Tấn as the political commissar. Their mission was to inflict damage on the regular units of the ARVN and destroy the strategic hamlets constructed by the former Ngô Đình Diệm regime. The VC identified the regions of Bình Long-Phước Long and Bà Rịa-Long Khánh, along Route 14, as the main targets for their offensive. Meanwhile, the Central Military Commission in Hanoi appointed General Nguyễn Chí Thanh as the commander of North Vietnamese military operations in southern Vietnam. Other high-ranking officers such as Major Generals Lê Trọng Tấn and Trần Độ, and Colonel Hoàng Cầm were sent to South Vietnam to supervise the military build-up which would commence in November 1964.

Prelude
In July 1964, the VC 271st Regiment and 272nd Regiment began moving into the provinces of Bình Dương, Bình Long and Phước Long to carry out their mission. During the first phase of their campaign, the VC regiments overran several strategic hamlets at Xan Sang, Cam Xe, Dong Xa, and Thai Khai. Between August and September 1964, VC regiments executed deep thrusts into Bình Dương and Châu Thành to apply additional pressure on South Vietnamese outposts situated on Route 14. During the second phase of their campaign, the VC ambushed two ARVN infantry companies and destroyed five armoured vehicles, which consisted of M24 Chaffee light tanks and M113 armored personnel carriers. The VC defeated regular ARVN units at the strategic hamlets of Bình Mỹ and Bình Co.

Following the completion of the initial stages in their campaign, the VC forces were ordered to regroup and prepare for the next offensive in the Long Khánh region. VC soldiers from the two regiments were assembled in War Zone D, where they were trained to attack well-fortified enemy strongholds. On November 20, 1964, the VC reached the Long Khánh battlefield, having completed a 200 kilometres march from War Zone D. On the battlefield the VC 186th Battalion (from Military Region 6), the 500th and 800th Battalions (from Military Region 7), and the 445th Company also joined the offensive. To kick-start their offensive in the Ba Ria-Long Khánh region, the VC selected Bình Giã as their next target. Bình Giã was a small village located in Phước Tuy Province, about 67 kilometres away from Saigon.

During the war about 6,000 people lived in Bình Giã, most of whom were staunchly anti-communist. The inhabitants of Bình Giã were Roman Catholic refugees who had fled from North Vietnam in 1954 during Operation Passage to Freedom because of fears of Communist persecution. To prepare for their main battle, the VC 272nd Regiment was ordered to block Inter-provincial Road No. 2 and 15, and destroy any South Vietnamese units attempting to reach Bình Giã from the south-western flank of the battlefield. In the days leading up to the battle, the VC often came out to harass the local militia forces. On December 9, 1964, the 272nd Regiment destroyed an entire ARVN mechanised rifle company along Inter-provincial Road No. 2, destroying 16 M-113 APCs. On December 17, the 272nd Regiment destroyed another six armoured vehicles on Inter-provincial Road No. 15.

Battle
During the early hours of December 28, 1964, elements of the VC 271st Regiment and the 445th Company signaled their main attack on Bình Giã by penetrating the village's eastern perimeter. There, they clashed with members of the South Vietnamese Popular Force militiamen, which numbered about 65 personnel. The militia fighters proved no match for the VC and their overwhelming firepower, so they quickly retreated into underground bunkers, and called for help. Once the village was captured, Colonel Ta Minh Kham, the VC regimental commander, established his command post in the main village church and waited for fresh reinforcements, which came in the form of heavy mortars, machine guns and recoilless rifles. To counter South Vietnamese helicopter assaults, Colonel Kham's troops set up a network of defensive fortifications around the village, with trenches and bunkers protected by land mines and barbed wire. The local Catholic priest, who was also the village chief, sent a bicycle messenger out to the Bà Rịa district headquarters to ask for a relief force. In response, the Bà Rịa district chief sent out elements of two Ranger battalions to retake Bình Giã. On December 29, two companies of the ARVN 33rd Ranger Battalion and a company from the 30th Ranger Battalion were airlifted into area located west of Bình Giã, by helicopters from the U.S. 118th Aviation Company to face an enemy force of unknown size.

As soon as the soldiers from the 30th and 33rd Ranger Battalions arrived at the landing zone, they were quickly overwhelmed by the VC in a deadly ambush. The entire 30th Ranger Battalion was then committed to join the attack, but they too did not initially succeed in penetrating the strong VC defensive lines. Several more companies of the Rangers then arrived for an attack from multiple directions. Two companies of the 33rd Ranger Battalion advanced from the northeast. One of them came to the outskirts of the village, but was unable to break through the VC defenses. The other one, trying to outflank the enemy, had been lured into a kill zone in open terrain and were quickly obliterated in an ambush by the three VC battalions using heavy weapons. The two companies suffered a 70 percent casualty rate, and survivors were forced to retreat to the nearby Catholic church. The 30th Rangers had more success by assaulting from the western direction and succeeded in fighting their way into the village, aided by local residents. It however also suffered heavy losses, with the battalion commander and his American adviser severely wounded. The local civilians in Bình Giã retrieved weapons and ammunition from the dead Rangers, and hid the wounded government soldiers from the VC. The 38th Ranger Battalion, on the other hand, landed on the battlefield unopposed by the VC, and they immediately advanced on Bình Giã from the south. Soldiers from the 38th Rangers spent the whole day fighting, but they could not break through the VC defences to link up with the survivors hiding in the church, and fell back after calling in mortar fire to decimate VC fighters moving to encircle them.

The morning of December 30, the 4th South Vietnamese Marine Battalion moved out to Bien Hoa Air Base, waiting to be airlifted into the battlefield. The 1/4th Marine Battalion was the first unit to arrive on the outskirts of Bình Giã, but the 1st Company commander decided to secure the landing zone, to wait for the rest of the battalion to arrive instead of moving on to their objective. After the rest of the 4th Marine Battalion had arrived, they marched towards the Catholic church to relieve the besieged Rangers. About one and a half hours later, the 4th Marine Battalion linked up with the 30th, 33rd and 38th Ranger Battalions, as the VC began withdrawing to the northeast. That afternoon the 4th Marine Battalion recaptured the village, but the VC was nowhere to be seen, as all their units had withdrawn from the village during the previous night, linking with other VC elements in the forest to attack the government relief forces. On the evening of December 30, the VC returned to Bình Giã and attacked from the south-eastern perimeter of the village. The local villagers, who discovered the approaching VC, immediately sounded the alarm to alert the ARVN soldiers defending the village. The South Vietnamese were able to repel the VC, with support from U.S. Army helicopter gunships flown out from Vung Tau airbase.

While pursuing the VC, a helicopter gunship from the U.S. 68th Assault Helicopter Company was shot down and crashed in the Quảng Giao rubber plantation, about four kilometres away from Bình Giã, killing four of its crewmen. On December 31, the U.S. Marines Advisory Group sent a team of four personnel, led by Captain Donald Cook, to Bình Giã to observe conditions on the battlefield. At the same time, the 4th Marine Battalion was ordered to locate the crashed helicopter and recover the bodies of the dead American crewmen. Acting against the advice of his American advisor, Major Nguyễn Văn Nho, commander of the 4th Marine Battalion, sent his 2/4th Marine Battalion company out to the Quảng Giao rubber plantation. Unknown to the 4th Marine Battalion, the VC 271st Regiment had assembled in the plantation. About one hour after they had departed from the village of Bình Giã, the commander of the 2/4th Marine Battalion reported via radio that his troops had found the helicopter wreckage, and the bodies of four American crewmen. Shortly afterwards, the VC opened fire and the 2/4th Marine Battalion was forced to pull back. In an attempt to save the 2nd Company, the entire 4th Marine Battalion was sent out to confront the VC. As the lead element of the 4th Marine Battalion closed in on the Quảng Giao plantation, they were hit by accurate VC artillery fire, which was soon followed by repeated human wave attacks. Having absorbed heavy casualties from the VC's ambush, the 2/4th Marine Battalion had to fight their way out of the plantation with their bayonets fixed. During the entire ordeal, the company did not receive artillery support because the plantation was beyond the range of 105mm artillery guns based in Phước Tuy and Bà Rịa. They however escaped with the crucial support of the U.S. aircraft and helicopters whose rocket attacks forced the enemy to pull back and halted their attempt at pursuit.

In the morning of December 31, the 4th Marine Battalion returned to the crash site with the entire force and the American graves were located and their corpses were dug up. At about 3 pm, a single U.S. helicopter arrived on the battlefield to evacuate the casualties, but they only picked up the bodies of the four American crewmen, while South Vietnamese casualties were forced to wait for another helicopter to arrive. At 4 pm, Major Nguyễn Văn Nho ordered the 4th Marine Battalion to carry their casualties back to the village, instead of continuing to wait for the helicopters. As the 4th Marine Battalion began their return march, three VC battalions, with artillery support, suddenly attacked them from three directions. The battalion's commanding and executive officers were immediately killed and air support was not available. Two Marine companies managed to fight their way out of the ambush and back to Bình Giã, but the third was overrun and almost completely wiped out. The fourth company desperately held out at a hilltop against VC artillery barrages and large infantry charges, before slipping out through the enemy positions at dawn. The 4th Marine Battalion of 426 men lost a total of 117 soldiers killed, 71 wounded and 13 missing. Among the casualties were 35 officers of the 4th Marine Battalion killed in action, and the four American advisers attached to the unit were also wounded. Backed by U.S. Air Force bombers, on January 1 three battalions of ARVN Airborne reinforcements arrived, they were too late as most of the VC had already withdrawn from the battlefield.

Aftermath

The battle of Bình Giã reflected the VC's growing military strength and influence, especially in the Mekong Delta region. It was the first time the VC launched a large-scale operation, holding its ground and fighting for four days against government troops equipped with armor, artillery and helicopters, and aided by U.S. air support and military advisers. The VC demonstrated that, when well-supplied with military supplies from North Vietnam, they had the ability to fight and inflict damage even on the best ARVN units.

The VC apparently suffered light casualties with only 32 soldiers officially confirmed killed, and they did not leave a single casualty on the battlefield. In recognition of the 271st Regiment's performance during the Bình Giã campaign, the VC High Command bestowed the title 'Bình Giã Regiment' on the unit to honour their achievement. Following the Bình Giã campaign, the VC went on to occupy  Hoài Đức District and the strategic hamlets of Đất Đỏ, Long Thành and Nhơn Trạch along Inter-provincial Road No. 2 and 15. They also expanded the Hát Dịch base area, which was located in Bà Rịa and Bình Thuận Provinces, to protect the important sea transportation routes used by the Vietnam People's Navy to supply VC units around the regions of the Mekong River.

Unlike their adversaries, the South Vietnamese military suffered heavily in their attempts to recapture the village of Bình Giã and secure the surrounding areas. The South Vietnamese and their American allies lost the total of about 201 personnel killed in action, 192 wounded and 68 missing. In just four days of fighting, two of South Vietnam's elite Ranger companies were destroyed and several others suffered heavy losses, while the 4th Marine Battalion was rendered ineffective as a fighting force. At that stage of the war, Bình Giã was the worst defeat experienced by the South Vietnamese. Despite their losses, the ARVN considered the battle as their victory and erected a monument at the site of the battle to acknowledge the sacrifices of the soldiers who had fallen to retake Bình Giã.

Order of battle (ground forces)

Viet Cong
 Main forces of B-2 Front: 271st Regiment, 272nd Regiment (renamed to the 1st Regiment, 2nd Regiment respectively and became part of the  9th Division on 2 Sep 1965), 80th Artillery Detachment
 Main forces of Military Region 6, 7, 8: 186th Battalion, 500th Battalion, 800th Battalion, 514th Battalion
 Local forces of Military Region 7: 440th Company, 445th Company

Army of the Republic of Vietnam
 Airborne Division: 1st Airborne Battalion, 3rd Airborne Battalion, 7th Airborne Battalion
 Marine Division: 4th Marine Battalion
 ARVN Rangers: 30th Ranger Battalion, 33rd Ranger Battalion, 38th Ranger Battalion, 35th Ranger Battalion
 ARVN Artillery and Armored Cavalry support: two artillery platoons, and one section of M-24 tanks.
 U.S.Army Aerial support: 68th Assault Helicopter Company

Notes

References

External links
 Binh Gia – The battle P.1 by Michael Martin Retrieved on 03/10/2010
 Binh Gia – The battle P.2 by Michael Martin Retrieved on 03/10/2010
 The Binh Gia Front by Tran Ngoc Toan Retrieved on 03/10/2010
 Battle of Binh Gia by Hieu Dinh Vu  Retrieved on 03/10/2010
 I Still Recall Binh Gia... Retrieved on 03/10/2010

Conflicts in 1964
Conflicts in 1965
1964 in Vietnam
1965 in Vietnam
Battles and operations of the Vietnam War in 1964
Battles and operations of the Vietnam War in 1965
Battles involving the United States
Battles involving Vietnam
December 1964 events in Asia
January 1965 events in Asia
History of Bà Rịa-Vũng Tàu Province